The discography for country singer Billy "Crash" Craddock consists of nineteen studio albums, three live albums, fifteen compilation albums and sixty-five singles.

Studio albums

1960s–1970s

1980s–2000s

Live albums

Compilation albums

Singles

1950s

1960s

1970s

1980s

Music videos

Notes

References

Country music discographies
 
 
Discographies of American artists